Arrie Rautenbach (born circa 1966) is the chief executive officer (CEO), of Absa Group Limited, a financial services conglomerate, with headquarters in Johannesburg, South Africa, and subsidiaries in eleven sub-Saharan countries. Prior to his current assignment, Rautenbach was the head of the bank group's
retail and business banking (RBB) unit. He takes over from Jason Quinn, who was the interim CEO of Absa Group from April 2021 to March 2022. Jason Quinn resumed his role as Absa Group's Financial Director. Rautenbach's tenure as Group CEO of Absa Group started on 29 March 2022.

Background and education
Rautenbach is a South African national. He holds a Bachelor of Business Administration degree (BBA) and a Master of Business Administration degree (MBA), both awarded by North-West University, Potchefstroom Campus. He has also received specialized training in management from INSEAD.

Career
At the time he became CEO of Absa Group, Rautenbach had over 25 years of banking experience. He joined Absa Group in the late 1990s, starting out at Bankfin. He has served in various roles, including as managing executive of distribution, managing executive of Absa Card Division and as chief executive of Retail and Business Banking.

Other considerations
In his new role as CEO of Absa Group, Rautenbach sits on the boards of Absa Group Limited and Absa Bank Limited. He is the substantive CEO appointed to replace the last substantive Absa Group CEO, Daniel Mminele, who resigned on 20 April 2021.

Rautenbach's tenure as Group CEO, began a few days before a new group Chairperson, Sello Moloko, assumed office, replacing Wendy Lucas-Bull, who retired on 31 March 2022.

See also
 Wendy Lucas-Bull
 Maria Ramos

References

External links
 Brief Biography at Absa Website

1960s births
Living people
Absa people
South African bankers
South African businesspeople
South African chief executives
North-West University alumni
INSEAD alumni